Caughall is a former civil parish, now in the parish of Backford, in Cheshire West and Chester, England.  It contains two buildings that are recorded in the National Heritage List for England as designated listed buildings, both of which are at Grade II.  This grade is the lowest of the three gradings given to listed buildings and is applied to "buildings of national importance and special interest".

References
Citations

Sources

Listed buildings in Cheshire West and Chester
Lists of listed buildings in Cheshire